The Mayor of Indianapolis is the head of the executive branch of the consolidated city-county government of Indianapolis and Marion County. As the chief executive, the mayor has the duty to oversee city-county government's various departments, agencies, and municipal corporations. They also have the power to either approve or veto bills passed by the Indianapolis City-County Council, the legislative branch. The mayor serves a four-year term and has no limit to the number of terms they may serve.

As of 2016, the mayor was paid an annual salary of $95,317.60. The Mayor's Office is on the twenty-fifth floor of the City-County Building.

Elections

The mayor of Indianapolis is elected every four years; elections take place one year before United States presidential elections on election day in November. The mayor is usually sworn in at noon on January 1 following the election. The next election for the mayor will be in 2023.

Indianapolis city elections are partisan, with party affiliations listed alongside candidates' names on the ballot. Primary elections are held on the first Tuesday of May in a mayoral election year. Candidates for mayor secure their party's nominations to campaign in the general election, held on Election Day the following November.

Lists
To date, 43 individuals have served as mayor. There have been 49 mayoralties due to six individuals who served nonconsecutive terms. John Caven, Caleb S. Denny, Charles A. Bookwalter, Samuel L. Shank, Reginald H. Sullivan, and Philip L. Bayt served two nonconsecutive terms each. The longest term was that of William "Bill" Hudnut, who served four consecutive terms for 16 years. The shortest term was that of Claude E. Negley, who served 13 days.

Pre-Unigov

Unigov

Unigov, the city-county consolidation of Indianapolis and Marion County governments, was enacted on January 1, 1970, exactly two years into Richard Lugar's first term as mayor. The new governance structure, codified in Indiana Code, mandates that the Mayor of Indianapolis is the chief executive of both the city and Marion County. Due to this structure, all Marion County residents are permitted to vote for the Mayor of Indianapolis, regardless if they live within the city or an excluded city or town. For example, residents of Beech Grove, which is an entirely independent municipality in Marion County, have the ability to vote for the Mayor of Indianapolis as well as their own mayor.

See also
Timeline of Indianapolis

Notes

External links
Official site

Mayors
Indianapolis
 
1847 establishments in Indiana